Bayterek may refer to:

Baiterek (monument), an observation tower in Nur-Sultan, capital of Kazakhstan
Bayterek, Almaty Region, a small town in Almaty Region, Kazakhstan
Bayterek District, former name: Zelenov, a district in Western Kazakhstan